"Alley Oop" is a song written and composed by Dallas Frazier in 1957. The song was inspired by the V. T. Hamlin-created comic strip of the same name.

The Hollywood Argyles
The Hollywood Argyles, a short-lived studio band, recorded the song in 1960, and it reached #1 on the Billboard Hot 100 and #3 on the US R&B chart. It also went to #24 on the UK chart. It was produced by Gary Paxton, who also sang lead vocals. At the time, Paxton was under contract to Brent Records, where he recorded as Flip of Skip & Flip.

According to Paxton:

Other versions
Also in 1960, Dante & the Evergreens released a version that went to #15 on the Billboard Hot 100, while The Dyna-Sores released a version that went to #59 on the same chart. Both Dante & The Evergreens' and The Hollywood Argyles' versions were credited as number ones in Cash Box magazine's singles chart.

The Pre-Historics released a version called "Alley Oop Cha-Cha-Cha" in 1960, with Gary Paxton (who had performed lead vocals on the Hollywood Argyles' version) and Skip Battin performing backing vocals. The Beach Boys recorded and released their version on their 1965 album Beach Boys' Party! The Kingsmen used the melody of "Alley Oop" for their song "Annie Fanny" (U.S. #47, 1965).

The British satirical art rock/pop group, The Bonzo Dog Doo-Dah Band, recorded a version of "Alley Oop," which was released as their second single in October 1966. The song's composer, Dallas Frazier, released his own version on his 1966 album Elvira. It was also performed by Dave Van Ronk and the Hudson Dusters on their self-titled album, released in 1967. The British group, The Tremeloes, recorded a version of the song as well. There is a Brazilian Portuguese-language version of the song, titled "Brucutu", recorded by Roberto Carlos in 1965,  with lyrics by Rossini Pinto.

Sha Na Na did a version of the song in a prehistoric times themed sketch from their TV show. Actress-singer Darlene Love recorded a version of the song for the 1984 film Bachelor Party. George Thorogood also performed a version of this song with his band, the Destroyers, and it was on his live album that was released on February 15, 1989. Ray Stevens's version was on his album Gitarzan.

The lyric "look at that caveman go" is referenced in David Bowie's "Life on Mars" from the album Hunky Dory. Marc Bolan's "Truck On (Tyke)" references Paxton's pronunciation of the word Dinosaur in its second verse line "I'm a space age cowboy, ride dinosaurs..." 

A variant of Alley Oop called Ollie Oop was written by Paul T. Clark and Gary S. Paxton. The song was a tribute to Col. Oliver North, again performed by Gary S. Paxton while Paul was part of the background singers. The record was released as a single and was played in some major markets,  but never quite took off.

Use in pro wrestling
In the late 1970s in the Memphis, TN-based CWA wrestling promotion, there was a wrestler on their roster named "Dream Machine" (local wrestler Troy Graham wearing a mask) and on one episode of the local Saturday morning CWA TV program, host Lance Russell showed a video of Dream Machine footage set to "Alley Oop".  After the video, Russell chuckled about it, causing an angry Dream Machine to run out and start choking Russell.  After Dream Machine was separated from Russell by his manager Jimmy Hart, CWA promoter Eddie Marlin fined Dream Machine and threatened to suspend him.

Also, in Mario Savoldi's International Championship Wrestling, wrestler Giant Gustov used it as his entrance music.

Charts

See also
 List of Billboard Hot 100 number-one singles of 1960

References

1957 songs
1960 debut singles
Billboard Hot 100 number-one singles
Cashbox number-one singles
Number-one singles in New Zealand
The Beach Boys songs
Songs written by Dallas Frazier
Novelty songs